Loveridge's rock gecko (Afroedura loveridgei) is a species of gecko, a lizard in the family Gekkonidae. The species is endemic to southeastern Africa.

Etymology
The specific name, loveridgei, is in honor of herpetologist Arthur Loveridge.

Geographic range
A. loveridgei is found in central Mozambique.

Description
The snout-to-vent length (SVL) of adults of A. loveridgei is usually .

Habitat
The preferred habitat of A. loveridgei is rock outcrops in arid savanna.

Diet
The diet of A. loveridgei consists of beetles, grasshoppers, and other insects.

Reproduction
A. loveridgei is oviparous. Eggs are laid in communal sites under flakes of rock. Each adult female lays a clutch of two eggs.

References

Further reading
Bauer AM, Good DA, Branch WR (1997). "The taxonomy of the southern African leaf-toed geckos (Squamata: Gekkonidae), with a review of Old World “Phyllodactylus” and the description of five new genera". Proc. California Acad. Sci. 49: 499–521. (Afroedura loveridgei, new status, p. 453).
Broadley DG (1963). "Three new lizards from South Nyasaland and Tete". Ann. Mag. Nat. Hist., Twelfth Series 6: 285–288. (Afroedura transvaalica loveridgei, new subspecies, p. 286).

Endemic fauna of Mozambique
loveridgei
Reptiles of Mozambique
Reptiles described in 1963